Dennis Burnett (born 27 September 1944) is an English former football defender.

Club career
He started his career as a youth team player at West Ham United, making his first team debut in October 1965. He played 66 games in all competitions for West Ham scoring three goals. In 1967 Burnett moved to Millwall, for £15,000, where he made over 250 appearances, taking over the captaincy whenever Harry Cripps was injured. In October 1973, for £70,000, he signed for Hull City. He also played for St. Louis Stars, Brighton & Hove Albion and Shamrock Rovers.

Burnett signed for Shamrock Rovers under John Giles in October 1977 and made his debut the same day as Gordon Banks made his League of Ireland debut. 
He made a total of 11 appearances before departing in December 1977.
Burnett went on to be assistant manager with Sussex side, Lancing and played in their 2–1 defeat by Horsham YMCA in the FA Cup in 1994, a month before his 50th birthday.

With Norwegian club SK Haugar he lost the 1979 Norwegian Football Cup final.

After football
Burnett ran a painting and decorating firm in the south of England after retiring from football and has been involved in club hospitality for West Ham United at Upton Park.

Sources 
 The Hoops by Paul Doolan and Robert Goggins

References

External links

1944 births
Living people
Footballers from Bermondsey
English footballers
Association football defenders
West Ham United F.C. players
Millwall F.C. players
Hull City A.F.C. players
North American Soccer League (1968–1984) players
St. Louis Stars (soccer) players
Brighton & Hove Albion F.C. players
Ilford F.C. players
Shamrock Rovers F.C. players
SK Haugar players
Lancing F.C. players
English Football League players
League of Ireland players
English expatriate footballers
Expatriate association footballers in the Republic of Ireland
Expatriate footballers in Norway
English expatriate sportspeople in Norway
Expatriate soccer players in the United States
English expatriate sportspeople in the United States